Joseph Carl Harder (February 1, 1916–August 21, 2004) was an American politician who served in the Kansas State Senate as a Republican from 1961 to 1992.

Harder was born in Hillsboro, Kansas and attended Bethel College. He married Maryan Lee Brooks in 1939 and served in the U.S. Navy during World War II. 

In 1960, he was first elected to the Kansas Senate from the 28th district. He served one term there, one term in the 29th district, and one term in the 18th district before settling in for five consecutive terms from the 25th district from 1972 to 1992, when he was succeeded by Patricia Ranson.

References

1916 births
2004 deaths
Republican Party Kansas state senators
People from McPherson County, Kansas
20th-century American politicians
Bethel College (Kansas) alumni
United States Navy personnel of World War II